Viktor Karl Einarsson (born 30 January 1997) is an Icelandic footballer who plays for Breiðablik.

Club career
He made his Eerste Divisie debut for Jong AZ on 18 August 2017 in a game against FC Den Bosch and scored on his debut.

On 24 July 2018, Viktor joined IFK Värnamo in Superettan, Sweden's second tier.

References

External links
 
 

1997 births
Viktor Karl Einarsson
Living people
Viktor Karl Einarsson
Viktor Karl Einarsson
Viktor Karl Einarsson
Viktor Karl Einarsson
Expatriate footballers in the Netherlands
Eerste Divisie players
IFK Värnamo players
Superettan players
Association football midfielders